Soura Khatril (urdu:سوڑہ کھتڑیل) is a Village of union council Ghungrila near Mandrah town, Tehsil Gujar Khan, District Rawalpindi in Pothohar region of Punjab, Pakistan

Locality 
Soura Khatril is located 4 km on eastern side of The historic Grand Trank Road which passes through the center of Mandrah town. There is main road link to Chakwal, Khushab and Sargodha from Mandrah.

Tribes 
Jaskham Khatril Tribe is major tribe of village Soura Khatril.A small number of Minhas also found in Soura.

Populated places in Rawalpindi District
Villages in Gujar Khan Tehsil